Stemwede is a municipality in the Minden-Lübbecke district, in North Rhine-Westphalia, Germany. Following a recent regional reorganization, in 1973, the former
districts of Dielingen-Wehdem and Levern were consolidated and the district of "Stemwede" created. The new name was chosen because for a thousand years the area along the Stemweder Berg (mountain) was popularly referred to as Stemwede.

Geography
Stemwede is situated approximately 20 km north-west of Lübbecke.

Subdivisions of the town
The municipality of Stemwede is divided into 3 districts (consisting of the following villages each):

References

External links